No Escape is a 1934 British drama film directed by Ralph Ince and starring Ian Hunter, Binnie Barnes and Molly Lamont. It was made at Teddington Studios by the British subsidiary of Warner Brothers.

Cast
 Ian Hunter as Jim Brandon  
 Binnie Barnes as Myra Fengler  
 Ralph Ince as Lucky  
 Molly Lamont as Helen Arnold  
 Charles Carson as Mr. Arnold  
 Philip Strange as Kirk Fengler  
 Madeline Seymour as Mrs. Arnold  
 George Merritt as Inspector Matheson

References

Bibliography
 Low, Rachael. Filmmaking in 1930s Britain. George Allen & Unwin, 1985.
 Wood, Linda. British Films, 1927-1939. British Film Institute, 1986.

External links

1934 films
British drama films
1934 drama films
1930s English-language films
Films shot at Teddington Studios
Quota quickies
Films directed by Ralph Ince
Warner Bros. films
British black-and-white films
1930s British films